Oucipo is part of the Ouxpo cultural movement that was in turn derived from the Oulipo literary movement, but with a specific focus on cinema.

Literally, the Workshop of Possible (or Potential) Cinema (Ouvroir de Cinématographie Potentielle), Oucipo was founded on October 7, 1974 by François Le Lionnais as Oucinépo, but later become more commonly known as Oucipo.

Oucipo in itself was never very active. However, it gave birth to numerous film production groups working along similar thematic lines.

References 

"Oucipo (ouvroir de cinéma potentiel)," PaperBlog Magazine, October 24, 2008

External links 
 Oucipo sur Fatrazie
 Un site consacré aux contraintes artistiques volontaires and audiovisuel à contraintes
 Regards sur le toit

'Pataphysics
Experimental film